Muscari commutatum is a species of perennial herb in the family Asparagaceae. They have a self-supporting growth form and simple, broad leaves and dry fruit.

Sources

References 

commutatum
Flora of Malta